The 2015 Miami ePrix, formally the 2015 FIA Formula E Miami ePrix, was a Formula E motor race held on 14 March 2015 at the Biscayne Bay Street Circuit, Miami, United States. It was the fifth championship race of the single-seater, electrically powered racing car series' inaugural season. The race was won by Nicolas Prost. Miami was subsequently dropped from the Formula E schedule for the 2015–16 season.

Report

Background
After the previous race in Buenos Aires, four driver changes took place. The first was Loïc Duval, replacing Oriol Servià at Dragon. The second was Scott Speed, replacing Marco Andretti at Andretti. Speed was the fourth driver in five races to drive the second car for Andretti. The third was Charles Pic returning to the series with China Racing, replacing Ho-Pin Tung. Pic had previously competed for Andretti in the first round in Beijing. Finally, Vitantonio Liuzzi replaced Michela Cerruti at Trulli GP.

Salvador Durán, Jean-Éric Vergne, and Bruno Senna were voted to receive the FanBoost, giving an extra 30 kWh for five seconds per car.

Classification

Qualifying

Notes:
  –Nelson Piquet Jr. received a five-place grid penalty for speeding under yellow flags in the previous race.
  –Nick Heidfeld was excluded for exceeding the maximum power usage.
  –Karun Chandhok was excluded for exceeding the maximum power usage.

Race

Nicolas Prost won ahead of Scott Speed, while Daniel Abt finished third despite leading on the penultimate lap. 

{| class="wikitable" style="font-size: 95%"
! 
! 
! Driver
! Team
! Laps
! Time/Retired
! Grid
! Points
|-
! 1
| 8
|  Nicolas Prost
| e.dams-Renault
| 39
| 46:12.349
| 2
| 25
|-
! 2
| 28
|  Scott Speed
| Andretti
| 39
| +0.433s
| 10
| 18
|-
! 3
| 66
|  Daniel Abt
| Audi Sport ABT
| 39
| +5.518s
| 4
| 15
|-
! 4
| 7
|  Jérôme d'Ambrosio
| Dragon Racing
| 39
| +5.941s
| 8
| 12
|-
! 5
| 99
|  Nelson Piquet Jr.
| China Racing
| 39
| +6.426s
| 7
| 10+2
|-
! 6
| 55
|  António Félix da Costa
| Amlin Aguri
| 39
| +8.754s
| 16
| 8
|-
! 7
| 6
|  Loïc Duval
| Dragon Racing
| 39
| +9.498s
| 18
| 6
|-
! 8
| 2
|  Sam Bird
| Virgin Racing
| 39
| +19.817s
| 3
| 4
|-
! 9
| 11
|  Lucas di Grassi
| Audi Sport ABT
| 39
| +20.631s
| 6
| 2
|-
! 10
| 77
|  Salvador Durán
| Amlin Aguri
| 39
| +24.587s
| 12
| 1
|-
! 11
| 3
|  Jaime Alguersuari
| Virgin Racing
| 39
| +43.883s
| 9
|
|-
! 12
| 23
|  Nick Heidfeld
| Venturi
| 39
| +47.878s
| 19
|
|-
! 13
| 9
|  Sébastien Buemi
| e.dams-Renault
| 39
| +1:04.587s
| 13
|
|-
! 14
| 5
|  Karun Chandhok
| Mahindra Racing
| 39
| +1:23.539s
| 20
|
|-
! 15
| 10
|  Jarno Trulli
| Trulli
| 38
| +1 lap
| 14
|
|-
! 16
| 18
|  Vitantonio Liuzzi
| Trulli
| 38
| +1 lap
| 11
|
|-
! 17
| 88
|  Charles Pic
| China Racing
| 38
| +1 lap
| 17
|
|-
! 18
| 27
|  Jean-Éric Vergne
| Andretti
| 37
| Collision Damage
| 1
| 3|-
! Ret
| 30
|  Stéphane Sarrazin
| Venturi
| 31
| Suspension
| 5
|
|-
! Ret
| 21
|  Bruno Senna
| Mahindra Racing
| 25
| Suspension
| 15
|
|}Notes: – Two points for fastest lap.
 – Three points for winning qualifying.

Standings after the race

Drivers' Championship standings

Teams' Championship standings

 Notes: Only the top five positions are included for both sets of standings.

References

External links
 Official results

|- style="text-align:center"
|width="35%"|Previous race:2015 Buenos Aires ePrix|width="30%"|FIA Formula E Championship2014–15 season|width="35%"|Next race:2015 Long Beach ePrix|- style="text-align:center"
|width="35%"|Previous race:N/A|width="30%"|Miami ePrix|width="35%"|Next race:None'''
|- style="text-align:center"

Miami ePrix
Miami ePrix
ePrix, Miami
Miami ePrix